Carlow College may mean:

In Carlow, County Carlow, Ireland:
Institute of Technology, Carlow
St. Patrick's, Carlow College
In Pittsburgh, Pennsylvania, United States: 
Carlow University